Piyasena Kahandagamage (1938?- 2003.08.16) is a Sinhala novelist and poet. Born in Baddegama, Galle, Sri Lanka he was a teacher by profession and a union leader. After the UNP government came to power in 1977 he was transferred (as a punishment for his political work) to rural Bintanne in Ampara district, where he based most of his novels.

Kahandagamage lost his job after the 1980 general strike. He started writing several serialized novels and articles for the Divaina newspaper. Most of his stories are based around   Dambana area where he lived and worked. He wrote several non-fiction books on Veddha culture, language and Sri Lankan farming methods.

His unique experience living among veddhas and his writings put him among the handful of writers who wrote about the rural Sinhalese and veddhas, including Leonard Wolfe and Maya Ranjan. His book Vanagatha Charika was translated to English as Jungle jaunts by Tilak Balasuriya.

Works 
Bintanne Janakavi
Bintanne Vitti
Dakune Palathe Katabaha
Digamadulu Janavahara
Ibema Nalavian Puthe (collection of poems, 1979)
Janasrutiya ha Janatava
Kataka Mahima: Kamatha
Kataka Mahima: Kumbura
Kataka Mahima: Kempahan
Kohombane Vattavidane
Maa dutu Bintanne
Nimanayake Andare
Panamure Ath Raja
Prasdhesiya Vivahara
Vanagatha Charika
Vana Vadule Vasanthaya

Sinhalese writers
1938 births
2003 deaths
Sri Lankan novelists
Sri Lankan poets
20th-century poets
20th-century novelists